The Motorola W220 is an entry level flip-phone for the GSM network, introduced in 2006. The phone features dual-band capabilities, an FM Radio, and a 65k color screen. Visually its design was based on the popular Razr phones from the same manufacturer.

External links
Motorola W220
Motorola W220 - Full phone specifications

W220
Mobile phones introduced in 2006